Johnny Joo is an American photographer. He photographs urban decay in abandoned and historic structures.

Work 

Joo photographs abandoned and derelict buildings. He has taken photographs of the abandoned Land of Oz theme park on Beech Mountain, North Carolina, Mike Tyson's former mansion in Ohio, and the Steele Mansion of Painesville, Ohio. He self-publishes books of his photography, including Empty Spaces: Photojournalism Through the Rust Belt in 2014 and Americana Forgotten in 2016.

Bibliography 
 Empty Spaces: Photojournalism Through the Rust Belt. Self-published (May 2014)
 Americana Forgotten (soft cover first edition). Self-published (May 2016)
 Americana Forgotten (hard cover edition). Self-published (November 15, 2016) 
 Unbuilt by Time: The World We Once Knew. Self-published (2017)

Exhibition 

 Unveiled – Solo show – Mentor City Hall, Mentor, Ohio, 2017

See also 
 Dead mall
 Ruins photography
 Urban exploration

References 

Living people
Photographers from Ohio
Year of birth missing (living people)